Pomezeu is a commune in Bihor County, Crișana, Romania with a population of 2,922 people. It is composed of eight villages: Câmpani de Pomezeu (Nagypapmező), Coșdeni (Kosgyán), Hidiș (Hegyes), Lacu Sărat, Pomezeu, Sitani (Szitány), Spinuș de Pomezeu (Tősfalva) and Vălani de Pomezeu (Papmezővalány).

References

Pomezeu
Localities in Crișana